The Heraklion Archaeological Museum is a museum located in Heraklion on Crete. It is one of the greatest museums in Greece and the best in the world for Minoan art, as it contains by far the most important and complete collection of artefacts of the Minoan civilization of Crete.  It is normally referred to scholarship in English as "AMH" (for "Archaeological Museum of Heraklion"), a form still sometimes used by the museum in itself.

The museum holds the great majority of the finds from Knossos and other Minoan sites in Crete.

History

The museum began in 1883 as a simple collection of antiquities; it was about the time when the Minoan civilization was beginning to be rediscovered, and shortly before the first excavations using proper scientific methods.  It was also during the period when Crete was a virtually autonomous part of the Ottoman Empire, after the Pact of Halepa of 1878, later followed by the independent Cretan State (1898-1913), protected by a military occupation by the Great Powers.  The political situation helped to keep Cretan finds on the island during a crucial period of discoveries. 

A dedicated building was constructed from 1904 to 1912 at the instigation of two Cretan archaeologists, Iosif Hatzidakis and Stefanos Xanthoudidis. After three destructive earthquakes in 1926, 1930, and 1935, the museum nearly collapsed. The director of the Heraklion Museum was then Spyridon Marinatos, who made great efforts to find funds and persuade the locals and the central government alike that a new solid building was needed. In 1935, Marinatos succeeded in engaging Patroklos Karantinos to build a sturdy structure that has withstood both natural disasters and the bombing that accompanied the German invasion in 1941. Although the museum was damaged during World War II, the collection survived intact and again became accessible to the public in 1952. A new wing was added in 1964.

The Herakleion Archaeological Museum is one of the largest and most important museums in Greece, and among the most important museums in Europe. It houses representative artifacts from all the periods of Cretan prehistory and history, covering a chronological span of over 5,500 years from the Neolithic period to Roman times. The singularly important Minoan collection contains unique examples of Minoan art, many of them true masterpieces. The Heraklion Museum is rightly considered as the museum of Minoan culture par excellence worldwide.

The museum is located in the town centre. It was built between 1937 and 1940 by architect Patroklos Karantinos on a site previously occupied by the Roman Catholic monastery of Saint-Francis which was destroyed by earthquake in 1856. The museum's antiseismic building is an important example of modernist architecture and was awarded a Bauhaus commendation. Karantinos applied the principles of modern architecture to the specific needs of a museum by providing good lighting from the skylights above and along the top of the walls, and facilitating the easy flow of large groups of people. He also anticipated future extensions to the museum. The colours and construction materials, such as the veined polychrome marbles, recall certain Minoan wall-paintings which imitate marble revetment. The two-storeyed building has large exhibition spaces, laboratories, a drawing room, a library, offices and a special department, the so-called Scientific Collection, where numerous finds are stored and studied. The museum shop, run by the Archaeological Receipts Fund, sells museum copies, books, postcards and slides. There is also a café.

Most of the museum was closed for renovation from 2006 and reopened in May 2013.

The Heraklion Archaeological Museum is a Special Regional Service of the Ministry of Culture and its purpose is to acquire, safeguard, conserve, record, study, publish, display and promote Cretan artefacts from the Prehistoric to the Late Roman periods. The museum organizes temporary exhibitions in Greece and abroad, collaborates with scientific and scholarly institutions, and houses a variety of cultural events.

Collections

Room I
Covers findings from 6000 BCE to the pre-Palatial period, including:
 Neolithic fertility goddess
 Vasiliki ware
 stone jars from the island of Mochlos
 miniature clay sculptures

Room II
Covers findings from 2000 BCE to 1700 BCE in Knossos, Malia and several peak sanctuaries, including:
 Kamares ware pottery
 glazed plaques of Minoan houses (aka the "Town Mosaic")
 peak sanctuary figurines

Room III 

 Phaistos Disc
 Kamares ware pottery

Room IV

Covers findings from 1700 BCE to 1450 BCE, including:
 bull's head rhyton from Knossos
 snake goddess figurines
 tools and weapons, mostly cast in bronze
 cups with Linear A inscriptions

Room V
Covers findings from 1450 BCE to 1400 BCE, including:
 ancient Egyptian trade objects
 clay model of a house
 examples of a Linear A and Linear B scripts

Room VI
Covers findings from cemeteries at Knossos, Phaistos and Archanes, including:
 clay figurines
 gold jewellery
 horse burial from a tholos tomb at Archanes

Room VII

Covers findings from 1700 BCE to 1300 BCE from smaller villas and sacred caves, including:
 bronze double axes
 the "Harvesters Vase"
 steatite vases from Hagia Triada
 gold jewelry from Malia

Room VIII – Zakros
Covers findings from 1700 BCE to 1450 BCE from the palace of Zakros, including:
 rock crystal rhyton
 bull's head rhyton
 pottery with floral and marine motifs

Room IX
Covers findings from 1700 BCE to 1450 BCE in eastern Crete, including:
 terracotta figurines from Pisokephalo peak sanctuary
 seal stones

Room X – Mycenaean
Covers findings from 1400 BCE to 1100 BCE, including:
 clay figurines
 clay sculpture of dancers with a lyre player

Room XI – Dorian
Covers findings from 1100 BCE to 900 BCE during the arrival of the Dorian Greeks, including:
 weapons and tools, mostly of iron
 clay fertility figurines
 votive offerings

Room XII
Covers findings up to 650 BCE, including:
 pottery decorated with griffins
 artefacts and figurines from Kato Syme

Room XIII – Larnakes
Minoan larnakes (clay coffins) are on display here.

Room XIV – Hall of the Frescoes

 Frescoes from Knossos and Hagia Triada
 The Hagia Triada sarcophagus

Room XV & Room XVI
 More frescoes, including the famous "La Parisienne"

Room XX – Classical Greek, Greco-Roman
Sculptures from Classical Greek and Greco-Roman periods

Visitor information
The museum is open April–September, Monday 12–8pm Tuesday–Sunday 8am–7pm, October–March daily 8am–5pm.

EU students can receive a discounted entry.

There is air conditioning within the building.

Some of the collection cannot be photographed due to publication or another reason. There are usually signs posted nearby the restricted items.

Notable artifacts
Snake Goddess
Phaistos Disc
Arkalochori Axe
Malia Pendant

Gallery

See also
 List of museums in Greece
 Minoan pottery

References

Bibliography
 The Rough Guide to Crete. .

External links

Hellenic Ministry of Culture and Tourism
Hellenic Ministry of Foreign Affairs
City of Herakleion
Heraklion Archaeological Museum - Ebook by Latsis Foundation
http://ancient-greece.org/museum/muse-iraclion.html
http://www.interkriti.org/museums/hermus.htm
http://www.explorecrete.com/archaeology/heraklion-museum.html
https://web.archive.org/web/20060317143414/http://www.dilos.com/location/11159
http://www.heraklion-crete.org/archaeological-museum/
The highlights from the collection
Archeological Museum

 
Museums established in 1883
1883 establishments in Greece
Heraklion
Museums in Heraklion
History of Crete